This is a list of programs broadcast by FX as of July 2022.

Current programming

Acquired from FX Networks
American Crime Story
American Horror Story
Atlanta
Breeders
It's Always Sunny in Philadelphia (shared with FXX)
The Old Man
Mayans M.C.
Snowfall
What We Do in the Shadows

Other acquired shows
Chicago Fire
Chicago Med
Chicago P.D.
Hudson & Rex
Law & Order
Law & Order: Organized Crime
Law & Order: Special Victims Unit
The Resident

Former programming
Shows listed in bold are sourced from FX Networks and FX on Hulu.
2 Broke Girls
30 Rock
A Teacher
All My Children
American Dad!
The Americans
The Beat (Canadian TV series)
Between
Better Things
Bob's Burgers
The Booth at the End
Brand X with Russell Brand
The Bridge
Brooklyn Nine-Nine
Crusoe
Da Vinci's Inquest
Da Vinci's City Hall
Departures
Devs
Ed's Up
Empire
EP Daily
Family Guy
Fargo
Feud
Fringe
Glenn Martin, DDS
Hockey Night in Canada (overflow)
House
How I Met Your Mother
Intelligence
The League
Legion
Lights Out
Louie
Married
Metropia
Mr. Inbetween
Mrs. America
Murdoch Mysteries
The Office (U.S. TV series)
One Life to Live
Parks and Recreation
Package Deal
Pose
Reviews on the Run
Seed
Sex & Drugs & Rock & Roll
Sons of Anarchy
Sunnyside
Taboo
Terriers
Totally Biased with W. Kamau Bell
The Listener
The Simpsons
The Strain
The Tunnel
Two and a Half Men
Tyrant
The Ultimate Fighter: Live
Unsupervised
Wilfred
Woke
Y: The Last Man

See also
FX Canada
FX
FX Australia
Fox
Fox International Channels

References

External links
FXNOW Canada

FX Canada